Stéphane Quême, (born January 2, 1973), known as DJ Falcon, is a French DJ, record producer and photographer. He is the brother of Delphine Quême (Quartet) and a cousin of Alan Braxe (Alain Quême).

Career
In 1999, Falcon released his first EP on Roulé, Thomas Bangalter of Daft Punk's music label.  Before producing on Roulé, he worked in the A&R department at Virgin. Following the release of his EP, he worked with Bangalter to form the group Together, officially releasing two songs "So Much Love to Give" and "Together." He has done a significant number of remixes and DJ sets since.

In 2013, he was featured on Daft Punk's fourth studio album, Random Access Memories on the final track "Contact." The song was based on a sample Falcon and Bangalter had originally used and performed while doing DJ sets as Together.

In 2022, Falcon and Alan Braxe debuted new music on a new record label Smugglers Way, an imprint of Domino, that intends to release new and old French house music from the duo and from other artists. In addition to this, the pair announced the two had begun making music as a duo named Braxe + Falcon - with their first single in March, their first EP in August, and a debut solo album intended for release in early 2023. Their debut single features vocals from Panda Bear.

Discography

Releases
 Hello My Name Is DJ Falcon (1999)

With Together 

 "Together" (2000)
 "So Much Love To Give" (2002)

With Braxe + Falcon 

 "Step By Step" feat. Panda Bear / "Creative Source" (2022)
 Step By Step EP (2022)

Remixes

Appears on
 "Contact" – Daft Punk (2013)

References

External links
 Personal website
 German website
 Facebook page

Living people
French house musicians
Club DJs
Remixers
Virgin Records artists
French DJs
1976 births
Grammy Award winners
Electronic dance music DJs
Ableton Live users